Real Colorado Cougars is an American women's soccer team, founded in 2003. The team is a member of the United Soccer Leagues W-League, the second tier of women's soccer in the United States and Canada. The team plays in the Western Conference against the Colorado Force, LA Strikers,  Pali Blues, Santa Clarita Blue Heat, Seattle Sounders Women, Vancouver Whitecaps FC (women)  and Victoria Highlanders Women.

The team plays its home games at Shea Stadium in the city of Highlands Ranch, Colorado, 25 miles south of downtown Denver. The club's colors are gold, black and white.

Prior to the 2010 season they were known as Colorado Rush. Until 2005 the team was known as the Denver Lady Cougars.

The team is a sister organization of the men's Real Colorado Foxes team, which is scheduled to join the USL Premier Development League in 2009.

Players

Current Roster 2009

Year-by-year

External links
 Colorado Rush website
 Colorado Rush on USL Soccer

Soccer clubs in Denver
Women's soccer clubs in Colorado
USL W-League (1995–2015) teams
2003 establishments in Colorado
Association football clubs established in 2003